Salam Atilola (born 2 February 1996 in Saki, Nigeria who has short playing time with Crown, Shooting Stars F.C., MFM FC all in Nigeria National League except Abia Warriors F.C. in the Nigeria First division who later sacked him on poor performance. Atilola Abdulsalam Tunde who joined Abia Warriors in the Nigeria Premier League season february 2019 mid-season window transfer registered only 3 goals from 8 games  in 2018/19 season. He was sacked the following season 2019/20 from Abia Warriors F.C. in January after un-impressive performance playing 15 games without a goal as a Striker.

Career
Salam Atilola is a natural left footed Striker. He was discovered by Karamone. He started his professional league football debut with Crown in 2012/13 season later sacked  sacked and later signed by Shooting Stars F.C. in 2013/14 after he was sacked. He also played for MFM FC in the Nigeria Second division league 2014/15 season and was later also sacked after average performance.

References

External links
- Fifa League Result ~ Salam Atilola Goal

1996 births
Living people
Nigerian footballers
Nigeria Professional Football League players
Association football forwards
Nigerian expatriate footballers
Karamone F.C. players
Shooting Stars S.C. players
Yoruba sportspeople
Nigerian expatriate sportspeople in Eswatini
Expatriate footballers in Eswatini
Abia Warriors F.C. players